Tong Tsz Wing (born July 26, 1992, in Hong Kong) is a professional squash player who represents Hong Kong. She reached a career-high world ranking of 40 in March 2017.

Career
In 2016, she was part of the Hong Kong team that won the bronze medal at the 2016 Women's World Team Squash Championships in France.

References 

1992 births
Living people
Hong Kong people
Hong Kong female squash players
Asian Games medalists in squash
Asian Games bronze medalists for Hong Kong
Squash players at the 2014 Asian Games
Medalists at the 2014 Asian Games
21st-century Hong Kong women